Olean is a ghost town in Graham County, Kansas, United States.

History
Olene was issued a post office in 1879. The post office name was changed to Olean in 1880, then moved to Leland in 1888.

References

Further reading

External links
 Graham County maps: Current, Historic, KDOT

Former populated places in Graham County, Kansas
Former populated places in Kansas